Min Yeong-chan (3 December 1873 – 16 November 1948), was scion of the powerful Min clan of the late Joseon period in Korea. Along with his elder brother Min Yeong-hwan, Yeong-chan served in a number of official positions towards the end of the Joseon dynasty. In 1900, he served as a Korean commissioner to the Paris Universal Exposition.

Early life and education 
Min Yeong-chan was born on 3 December 1873 into the Yeoheung Min clan to Min Gyeom-ho and Lady Seo. He was the younger brother of Min Yeong-hwan. The Min clan rose to great prominence and power with its royal alliance. As such, Min Yeong-chan received the best education studying alongside the future Emperor Sunjong.

Career
In 1889, Min passed the national civil service exam and was then named to an official position in the Hongmungwan (홍문관, 弘文館), of Office of Special Advisors. In 1897, he was named vice-president of the Hanseong Bank Corporation. In 1900, Min served as royal commissioner to the Paris Universal Exposition.

He was promoted to Major General on 16 July 1904.

Family 
 Great-Great-Great-Great-Great-Grandfather
 Min Yu-jung (민유중, 閔維重) (1630 - 29 June 1687); Queen Inhyeon’s father
 Great-Great-Great-Great-Great-Grandmother
 Internal Princess Consort Pungchang of the Pungyang Jo clan (풍창부부인 풍양 조씨, 豊昌府夫人 豊壤 趙氏) (1659 - 1741); Min Yu-jung’s third wife
 Great-Great-Great-Great-Grandfather
 Min Jin-yeong (민진영, 閔鎭永) (1682 - 1724); Queen Inhyeon’s younger half-brother
 Great-Great-Great-Grandfather
 Min Ak-su (민악수, 閔樂洙)
 Great-Great-Grandfather
 Min Baek-sul (민백술, 閔百述)
 Great-Grandfather
 Min Dan-hyeon (민단현, 閔端顯)
 Great-Grandfather
 Lady Park of the Malyang Park clan (말양 박씨)
 Grandfather
 Min Chi-gu (민치구, 閔致久) (1795-1874)
 Grandmother
 Lady Yi of the Jeonju Yi clan (? - 17 November 1873) (정경부인 전주 이씨,  全州 李氏); daughter of Yi Ok (1773 - 1820) (이옥, 李火玉)
 Father
 Min Gyeom-ho (민겸호, 閔謙鎬) (1838 - 10 June 1882)
 Aunt - Grand Internal Princess Consort Sunmok of the Yeoheung Min clan (순목대원비, 純穆大院妃) (3 February 1818 - 8 January 1898)
 Uncle - Grand Internal Prince Heungseon (흥선대원군) (24 January 1820 - 22 February 1898)
 Cousin - Cousin - Lady Yi of the Jeonju Yi clan (1838 - 1869)
 Cousin - Yi Jae-myeon, Prince Imperial Heung (흥친왕 이재면, 興親王 李載冕) (22 August 1845 - 9 September 1912)
 Cousin - Emperor Gojong of Korea (대한제국 고종) (8 September 1852 - 21 January 1919)
 Cousin - Lady Yi of the Jeonju Yi clan (1861 - 1899)
 Uncle - Min Seung-ho (민승호, 閔升鎬) (1830 - 1874)
 Aunt - Lady Kim of the Gwangsan Kim clan (본관: 광산 김씨, 光山 金氏) (? - ? 23 April)
 Unnamed cousin (? - 1874)
 Aunt - Lady Kim of the Yeonan Kim clan (본관: 연안 김씨, 延安 金氏) (? - ? 11 February)
 Aunt - Lady Yi of the Deoksu Yi clan (본관: 덕수 이씨, 德水 李氏) (? - ? 1 July)
 Uncle - Min Tae-ho (민태호, 閔台鎬) (1834 - 18 October 1884)
 Aunt - Lady Paseong of the Papyeong Yun clan (파성부부인 파평 윤씨)
 Aunt - Lady Jinyang of the Jincheon Song clan (진양부부인 진천 송씨)
 Cousin - Min Yeong-ik (민영익, 閔泳翊) (1860 - 1914); became the adoptive son of Min Seung-ho 
 Cousin - Empress Sunmyeong of the Yeoheung Min clan (순명효황후 민씨) (20 November 1872 - 5 November 1904)
 Adoptive cousin - Min Yeong-rin (민영린, 閔泳璘) (1873 - 1 June 1932); son of Min Sul-ho 
 Mother
 Lady Seo (서씨, 徐氏)
 Grandfather - Seo Gyeong-sun (서경순, 徐庚淳)
 Brother
 Older brother: Min Yeong-hwan (민영환, 閔泳煥) (7 August 1861 - 30 November 1905)
 Sister-in-law: Lady Kim of the Andong Kim clan (김씨, 金氏); (본관: 안동 김씨, 김명진의 딸) Min Yeong-hwan's first wife; daughter of Kim Myeong-jin (김명진, 金明鎭)
 Sister-in-law: Park Soo-young of the Bannam Park clan (박수영); (본관: 반남 박씨, 박용훈의 딸) Min Yeong-hwan's second wife; daughter of Park Yong-hoon (박용훈, 朴龍勳)
 Nephew: Min Beom-sik (민범식, 閔範植) (1896 - ?)
 Nephew: Min Jang-sik (민장식, 閔章植)
 Nephew: Min Gwang-sik (민광식, 閔光植)
Wives and issue(s):
Lady Kang of the Geumcheon Kang clan (강씨, 姜氏); from Korea
Son: Min Hong-sik (민홍식)
 Daughter-in-law: Lady Hwang of the Changwon Hwang clan (5 December 1894 – 22 May 1914); Min Hong-sik’s first wife 
Daughter: Lady Min (민씨)
Lady Meiri of the Hu clan (후메이리, 胡美梨); from China

References

External links
Min Yeong-chan on Encykorea .

Korean politicians
1873 births
Year of death missing
Yeoheung Min clan
Imperial Korean military personnel
Major generals of Korean Empire
Officials of the Korean Empire